Major General Eldon Arthur Bargewell (August 13, 1947 – April 29, 2019) was a United States Army General officer. He served as commander of the U.S. Army's Delta Force unit.

Early life and education
Bargewell was born in Hoquiam, Washington and graduated from Hoquiam High School in 1965, enlisting in the U.S. Army in 1967. He completed the Special Forces Qualification Course in 1968. During the Vietnam War Bargewell was accepted into MACV-SOG where he served at the "Command And Control North (CCN)" Forward Operating Base 4 at Da Nang and served as Non-Commissioned Officer Team Leader for Reconnaissance Team "Viper" (all CCN teams were named for states or snakes). While serving with CCN, Bargewell earned the Distinguished Service Cross in September 1971 for his actions in combat in saving his team and getting them to safety.

Career
Bargewell graduated from Officer candidate School and received his commission in 1973.  In addition, he completed a Bachelor of Science degree in resource management at Troy State University.

Bargewell's first assignment was as a member of the 2nd Battalion 75th Ranger Regiment at Fort Lewis, Washington, where he later served as rifle platoon leader and executive officer. As a captain, Bargewell was assigned as Rifle Company Commander with 2nd Battalion, 47th Infantry. In 1981 Bargewell volunteered for and completed a specialized selection and operator training course for assignment to Delta Force where he would serve as Operations Officer, Squadron Executive Officer, Troop commander, Squadron Commander (twice), Deputy Commander and unit commander from July 1996 to July 1998.

While in Delta Force Bargewell participated in Operation Acid Gambit during the invasion of Panama, including the daring rescue of American citizen Kurt Muse from the Modelo prison. After the successful extraction of the hostage the MH-6 Little Bird transporting Muse as well as several Operators crashed behind enemy lines wounding many of them; however, they managed to seek cover in the city until they were recovered by an APC.

He commanded a Delta Force Squadron (A Squadron) during Operation Desert Storm in western Iraq. In 1998 Bargewell became Commanding General of Special Operations Command Europe, followed by assistant chief of staff for SFOR military operations in Sarajevo.
Bargewell returned to the continental United States, and served as director of the center of operations, plans, and policies of United States Special Operations Command. In 2005, Bargewell became Director of Strategic Operations at Multinational Force Iraq.  While serving as the Operations Officer, Bargewell pursued an outside administrative investigation as to how knowledge of the Haditha incident in Iraq passed up the Marine chain of command and whether or not any commanders lied in their reports. The informal investigation, pursuant to Army regulation AR 15-6, began on March 19, 2006, and was expected to examine how servicemembers and their commanders were trained in the rules of engagement. The completed report was sent to Army Lt. Gen. Peter W. Chiarelli, the second-ranked US commander in Iraq, on the morning of June 15, 2006.  This was separate from a criminal investigation being conducted by the Naval Criminal Investigative Service.

Distinguished Service Cross

Citation:
The President of the United States of America, authorized by Act of Congress, July 9, 1918 (amended by act of July 25, 1963), takes pleasure in presenting the Distinguished Service Cross to Staff Sergeant Eldon A. Bargewell, United States Army, for extraordinary heroism in connection with military operations involving conflict with an armed hostile force in the Republic of Vietnam, while serving with Command and Control (North), Task Force 1, Studies and Observations Group, 5th Special Forces Group (Airborne), 1st Special Forces, attached to U.S. Army Vietnam Training Advisory Group (TF1AE), U.S. Army Vietnam Training Support Headquarters. Staff Sergeant Bargewell distinguished himself on 27 September 1971 while serving as a member of a long range reconnaissance team operating deep in enemy territory. On that date, his team came under attack by an estimated 75 to 100 man enemy force. Staff Sergeant Bargewell suffered multiple fragmentation wounds from an exploding B-40 rocket in the initial assault, but despite the serious wounds, placed a deadly volume of machine gun fire on the enemy line. As the enemy advanced, he succeeded in breaking the assault and forced them to withdraw with numerous casualties. When the enemy regrouped, they resumed their assault on the beleaguered team, placing a heavy volume of small arms and automatic weapons fire on Staff Sergeant Bargewell's sector of the defensive perimeter. Again he exposed himself to the enemy fire in order to hold his position and prevent the enemy from overrunning the small team. After breaking the enemy assault, the team withdrew to a nearby guard. At the landing zone, Staff sergeant Bargewell refused medical treatment in order to defend a sector of the perimeter, and insured the safe extraction of his team. Staff Sergeant Bargewell's extraordinary heroism and devotion to duty were in keeping with the highest traditions of the military service and reflect great credit upon himself, his unit, and the United States Army.

Death

Bargewell died near his home at the age of 71.

Awards and decorations

Bargewell was inducted into the U.S. Army Ranger Hall of Fame in 2011.

References

External links

"House to Look Into Probe of Pendleton Marines" by Tony Perry, LA Times

1947 births
2019 deaths
United States Army generals
Members of the United States Army Special Forces
Recipients of the Distinguished Service Cross (United States)
Recipients of the Legion of Merit
United States Army personnel of the Vietnam War
United States Army personnel of the Gulf War
People from Hoquiam, Washington
Military personnel from Washington (state)
Delta Force
United States Army Rangers
Accidental deaths in Alabama